The following highways are numbered 890:

Canada
 New Brunswick Route 890

United States